Brian Richardson (born 24 July 1947) is an Australian former rower and rowing coach. He competed at the national elite level over a fifteen-year period representing both South Australian and Victoria. He was a representative at three world championships and at the 1976 Montreal and the 1980 Moscow Olympics. In a twenty-three year coaching career, he held national head coaching roles in both Canada and Australia from 1993 to 2008 and personally coached national crews to twelve world championship or Olympic medals.

Club and state rowing
Born in Adelaide, Richardson rowed from the Adelaide University Boat Club from 1966 till his relocation to Victoria in 1975. In Melbourne he rowed from the Monash University Boat Club and later he coached at the Banks Rowing Club and Mercantile Rowing Club.

Richardson stroked the Adelaide University eight at the 1973 and the 1974 Intervarsity Championships. The AUBC eight won the 1974 Intervarsity Championship.

Richardson first made state selection for South Australia still aged eighteen, in the men's eight contesting the King's Cup at the 1966 Interstate Regatta. He rowed in eight successive South Australian King's Cup eights, placing second twice and stroking the 1973 and 1974 SA eights. After relocating to Melbourne, Richardson was selected in Victoria's King's Cup eight for the 1975 Interstate Regatta. He rowed in six consecutive Victorian King's Cup eights up to 1980, stroking those crews from 1978 and winning the King's Cup in 1979 and 1980. In total, Richardson rowed in fourteen consecutive King's Cup championships, five at stroke and won the event twice.

At the 1972 Australian Rowing Championships Richardson rowed in an AUBC four contesting the national coxless four title. They placed third. In 1976 and 1977 he again contested the coxed four national titles in Monash Uni/Melb Uni composite crews placing third, then second. He stroked a composite Monash Uni/Mercantile coxless four to second place in their national title attempt at the 1978 Australian Championships  and in 1979 stroked a Monash/MUBC crew again to second place in that same event. In 1980 his final year of competition in Monash University colours he raced in both a coxed four (to fourth place) and a coxless pair (to third place) in national title attempts.

International representative rowing
Richardson made his Australian representative debut in the six seat of the Australian men's eight at the 1975 World Rowing Championships in Nottingham. That crew placed second in its heat, won the repechage and finished in sixth place in the final.  The Australian men's eight for the 1976 Montreal Olympics was mostly that year's King's Cup winning New South Wales crew excepting  Richardson at bow and Malcolm Shaw in the two seat   They commenced their Olympic campaign with a heat win in a new world record time and progressed to the final. In the heat Shaw suffered a collapsed vertebra which saw him out of the eight and replaced by Peter Shakespear, the reserve. In the final the Australians finished fifth.

At the 1978 World Rowing Championships in Lake Karapiro he stroked Australia's coxless four to a ninth-place finish.[ For the 1979 World Rowing Championships in Bled, Richardson was the stroke of the Australian men's eight. An injury during the campaign to Rob Lang saw the squad's selected sculler Ted Hale step into the five seat of the eight. That crew placed third in their semi-final and fourth in the final.

For the 1980 Moscow Olympics the new Australian Director of Coaching Reinhold Batschi utilised small boating racing criteria and selected an eight with rowers from three states and picked the veteran Richardson as the stroke-man. The Australian eight finished in fifth place in the Olympic final.

Coaching career
Richardson enjoyed a stellar coaching career over a twenty-four year period. He coached eleven Victorian King's Cup crews and took seven of them to King's Cup victory. He coached twelve Australian crews to seven different world championships winning one gold and one bronze medal and took crews to three Olympics. While he was head coach of Canada, Canadian crews won sixty five medals at world championships and Olympics.

Richardson had national head coaching roles for Canada from 1993 to 1996 and again from 2001 to 2004 and for Australia from 1997 to 2000. Back in Australia from 2005 to 2008 he was the national men's coach and head coach at the Australian Institute of Sport. Overall, crews individually coached by Richardson won seven gold, four silver and one bronze Olympic or world championship medals.

Sailing and Australia II
In 1983 Richardson was a crewman on Australia II, the Royal Perth Yacht Club's entrant which contested and won the 1983 America's Cup. Richardson was a grinder in a crew skippered by John Bertrand which became the first ever successful America's Cup challenger and ended a 132-year tenure by the New York Yacht Club.

Rowing palmares

World Championships
 1975 World Rowing Championships men's eight six seat – sixth
 1978 World Rowing Championships coxless four stroke – ninth
 1979 World Rowing Championships men's eight stroke – fourth

Olympic Games
 1976 Munich Olympics M8+ bow – fifth
 1980 Moscow Olympics M8+ stroke - fifth

National Interstate Regatta

1966 – Interstate Championships Men's Eight (SA) four seat – third
1967 – Interstate Championships Men's Eight (SA) four seat – third
1968 – Interstate Championships Men's Eight (SA) stroke – fourth
1970 – Interstate Championships Men's Eight (SA) bow – second
1971 – Interstate Championships Men's Eight (SA) seven seat – second
1972 – Interstate Championships Men's Eight (SA) seven seat – fourth
1973 – Interstate Championships Men's Eight (SA) stroke - third
1974 – Interstate Championships Men's Eight (SA) stroke - second

1975 – Interstate Championships Men's Eight (VIC) six seat - third
1976 – Interstate Championships Men's Eight (VIC) stroke - second
1977 – Interstate Championships Men's Eight (VIC) five seat - third
1978 – Interstate Championships Men's Eight (VIC) stroke - second
1979 – Interstate Championships Men's Eight (VIC) stroke – first
1980 – Interstate Championships Men's Eight (VIC) stroke – first

Coaching palmares

Olympic Games
 1992 Barcelona Olympics – Men's Eight coach – fifth
 2000 Sydney Olympics – Men's Eight coach – silver
 2008 Beijing Olympics - Men's Eight coach - sixth

Commonwealth Games
 1986 – Commonwealth Games – Men's Coxless Four coach – Fourth
 1986 – Commonwealth Games – Men's Coxless Pair coach – Fifth

World Championships
1989 World Rowing Championships – men's double scull coach - fourth
1990 World Rowing Championships – men's double scull coach – bronze
1991 World Rowing Championships – men's dingle scull coach – fourth
1991 World Rowing Championships – men's quad scull coach - twelfth
1999 World Rowing Championships – men's eight coach – seventh
2005 World Rowing Championships – men's coxed pair coach – gold
2005 World Rowing Championships – men's quad scull coach – ninth
2006 World Rowing Championships – men's eight coach – fourth
2006 World Rowing Championships – men's coxless four coach – fifteenth
2007 World Rowing Championships – men's eight coach – seventh
2007 World Rowing Championships – men's coxless four co-coach – twelfth
2007 World Rowing Championships – men's coxed pair co-coach – fourth

National Interstate Regatta
1985 – Interstate Men's Eight Championship (VIC) coach – first
1986 – Interstate Men's Eight Championship (VIC) coach - first
1987 – Interstate Men's Eight Championship (VIC) co-coach - first
1988 – Interstate Men's Eight Championship (VIC) co-coach – first
1989 – Interstate Men's Eight Challenge (VIC) coach – first
1990 – Interstate Men's Sculling Championship (VIC) coach - second
1991 – Interstate Men's Sculling Championship (VIC) coach - first
1992 – Interstate Men's Sculling Championship (VIC) coach - second
1993 – Interstate Men's Eight Championship (VIC) co-coach – first
1993 – Interstate Men's Sculling Championship (VIC) co-coach - fourth
2008 – Interstate Men's Eight Championship co-coach (NSW) – first

National head coaching roles
 1993-1996 – Canada Head coach
 1997-2000 – Australia Head coach
 2001-2004 – Canada Head coach
 2005-2008 – Australia men's & AIS Head Coach

References

1947 births
Living people
Australian male rowers
Olympic rowers of Australia
Rowers at the 1976 Summer Olympics
Rowers at the 1980 Summer Olympics
Rowers from Adelaide
1983 America's Cup sailors